Maurice Louis Hochepied (9 October 1881 – 22 March 1960) was a French water polo player and freestyle swimmer. He competed at the 1900 Summer Olympics in five events and won a silver medal in the 200 m team swimming, alongside his brother, Victor Hochepied.

References

External links
 

1881 births
1960 deaths
French male freestyle swimmers
French male water polo players
Swimmers at the 1900 Summer Olympics
Water polo players at the 1900 Summer Olympics
Olympic swimmers of France
Olympic silver medalists for France
Olympic water polo players of France
Sportspeople from Lille
Medalists at the 1900 Summer Olympics
Olympic silver medalists in swimming
19th-century French people
20th-century French people